A bhaji is a type of fritter originating from the Indian subcontinent. It is made from spicy hot vegetables, commonly onion, and has several variants. It is a popular snack food in India, it is also very popular in Pakistan, and Trinidad and Tobago, and it can be found for sale in street-side stalls, especially in tapris (Marathi: टपरी) (on streets) and dhabas (Punjabi: ਢਾਬਾ) (on highways). It is also a common starter in Anglo-Indian cuisine across the United Kingdom. 

The Guinness World Record for the largest onion bhaji is held by one weighing  made by Oli Khan and Team of Surma Takeaway Stevenage on 4 February 2020.

Regional varieties 

Outside Southern and Western India, such preparations are often known as pakora. Its variations include the chili bajji, potato bajji, onion bajji, plantain bajji and the bread bajji (or bread pakoda). Another version is called bonda (in south India), vada (in Maharashtra) and Gota (in Gujarat). Bonda has potato or mixed vegetable filling while Gota is made by green fenugreek leaves.

Cultural significance 
Bhajis are a component of traditional Punjabi Pakistani and Gujarati Marathi, Tamil, Kannada and Telugu cuisines served on special occasions and at festivals. They are generally served with a cup of coffee, tea, or a traditional serving of yameen. They use banana peppers for making mirchi bhajji.

Onion bhajis are often eaten as a starter in Anglo-Indian restaurants before the main course, along with poppadoms and other Indian snacks. They may be served with a side of salad and slice of lemon, or with mango chutney, and are traditionally made to a mild taste.

Gallery

References

External links

Appetizers
Indian snack foods
Pakistani snack foods
Indo-Caribbean cuisine
Fritters
Tamil cuisine